Vibrio alginolyticus is a Gram-negative marine bacterium. It is medically important since it causes otitis and wound infection. It is also present in the bodies of animals such as pufferfish, where it is responsible for the production of the potent neurotoxin, tetrodotoxin.

Vibrio alginolyticus are commonly found in aquatic environments. Some strains of V. alginolyticus are highly salt tolerant and commonly found in marine environment. S.I. Paul et al. (2021) isolated and identified many strains of Vibrio alginolyticus from nine marine sponges of the Saint Martin's Island Area of the Bay of Bengal, Bangladesh. 

V. alginolyticus was first identified as a pathogen of humans in 1973. It occasionally causes eye, ear, and wound infections. It is a highly salt-tolerant species and can grow in salt concentrations of 10%. Most clinical isolates come from superinfected wounds that become contaminated at the beach.
Tetracycline is typically an effective treatment. V. alginolyticus is rare cause of bacteremia in immunocompromised hosts.

Biochemical characteristics of V. alginolyticus 
Colony, morphological, physiological, and biochemical characteristics of Vibrio alginolyticus are shown in the Table below.

Note: + = Positive, – =Negative

References

External links
Type strain of Vibrio alginolyticus at BacDive -  the Bacterial Diversity Metadatabase

Vibrionales
Bacteria described in 1961

Marine microorganisms